Chakras are various focal points used in a variety of ancient meditation practices, collectively denominated as Tantra, or the esoteric or inner traditions of Hinduism.

The concept of the chakra arose in the early traditions of Hinduism. Beliefs differ between the Indian religions, with many Buddhist texts consistently mentioning five chakras, while Hindu sources reference six or seven. Early Sanskrit texts speak of them both as meditative visualizations combining flowers and mantras and as physical entities in the body. Within Kundalini yoga, the techniques of breathing exercises, visualizations, mudras, bandhas, kriyas, and mantras are focused on manipulating the flow of subtle energy through chakras.

The modern Western chakra system arose from multiple sources, starting in the 1880s, followed by Sir John Woodroffe's 1919 book The Serpent Power, and Charles W. Leadbeater's 1927 book The Chakras, which introduced the seven rainbow colours for the chakras. Psychological and other attributes, and a wide range of supposed correspondences with other systems such as alchemy, astrology, gemstones, homeopathy, Kabbalah and Tarot were added later.

Etymology
 
Lexically, chakra is the Indic reflex of an ancestral Indo-European form *kʷékʷlos, whence also "wheel" and "cycle". It has both literal and metaphorical uses, as in the "wheel of time" or "wheel of dharma", such as in Rigveda hymn verse 1.164.11, pervasive in the earliest Vedic texts.

In Buddhism, especially in Theravada, the Pali noun cakka connotes "wheel". Within the central "Tripitaka", the Buddha variously refers the "dhammacakka", or "wheel of dharma", connoting that this dharma, universal in its advocacy, should bear the marks characteristic of any temporal dispensation. The Buddha spoke of freedom from cycles in and of themselves, whether karmic, reincarnative, liberative, cognitive or emotional.

In Jainism, the term chakra also means "wheel" and appears in various contexts in its ancient literature. As in other Indian religions, chakra in esoteric theories in Jainism such as those by Buddhisagarsuri means a yogic energy center.

Ancient history

The term chakra appears to first emerge within the Hindu Vedas, though not precisely in the sense of psychic energy centers, rather as chakravartin or the king who "turns the wheel of his empire" in all directions from a center, representing his influence and power. The iconography popular in representing the Chakras, states the scholar David Gordon White, traces back to the five symbols of yajna, the Vedic fire altar: "square, circle, triangle, half moon and dumpling".

The hymn 10.136 of the Rigveda mentions a renunciate yogi with a female named kunamnama. Literally, it means "she who is bent, coiled", representing both a minor goddess and one of many embedded enigmas and esoteric riddles within the Rigveda. Some scholars, such as D.G. White and Georg Feuerstein, have suggested that she may be a reference to kundalini shakti and a precursor to the terminology associated with the chakras in later tantric traditions.

Breath channels (nāḍi) are mentioned in the classical Upanishads of Hinduism from the 1st millennium BCE, but not psychic-energy chakra theories. Three classical Nadis are Ida, Pingala and Sushumna in which the central channel Sushumna is said to be foremost as per Kṣurikā-Upaniṣhad.  The latter, states David Gordon White, were introduced about 8th-century CE in Buddhist texts as hierarchies of inner energy centers, such as in the Hevajra Tantra and Caryāgiti. These are called by various terms such as cakka, padma (lotus) or pitha (mound). These medieval Buddhist texts mention only four chakras, while later Hindu texts such as the Kubjikāmata and Kaulajñānanirnaya expanded the list to many more.

In contrast to White, according to Feuerstein, early Upanishads of Hinduism do mention chakras in the sense of "psychospiritual vortices", along with other terms found in tantra: prana or vayu (life energy) along with nadi (energy carrying arteries). According to Gavin Flood, the ancient texts do not present chakra and kundalini-style yoga theories although these words appear in the earliest Vedic literature in many contexts. The chakra in the sense of four or more vital energy centers appear in the medieval era Hindu and Buddhist texts.

Overview

The Chakras are part of esoteric ideas and concepts about physiology and psychic centers that emerged across Indian traditions. The belief held that human life simultaneously exists in two parallel dimensions, one "physical body" (sthula sarira) and other "psychological, emotional, mind, non-physical" it is called the "subtle body" (sukshma sarira). This subtle body is energy, while the physical body is mass. The psyche or mind plane corresponds to and interacts with the body plane, and the belief holds that the body and the mind mutually affect each other. The subtle body consists of nadi (energy channels) connected by nodes of psychic energy called chakra. The belief grew into extensive elaboration, with some suggesting 88,000 chakras throughout the subtle body. The number of major chakras varied between various traditions, but they typically ranged between four and seven. Nyingmapa Vajrayana Buddhist teachings mention eight chakras and there is a complete yogic system for each of them.

The important chakras are stated in Hindu and Buddhist texts to be arranged in a column along the spinal cord, from its base to the top of the head, connected by vertical channels. The tantric traditions sought to master them, awaken and energize them through various breathing exercises or with assistance of a teacher. These chakras were also symbolically mapped to specific human physiological capacity, seed syllables (bija), sounds, subtle elements (tanmatra), in some cases deities, colors and other motifs.

Belief in the chakra system of Hinduism and Buddhism differs from the historic Chinese system of meridians in acupuncture. Unlike the latter, the chakra relates to subtle body, wherein it has a position but no definite nervous node or precise physical connection. The tantric systems envision it as continually present, highly relevant and a means to psychic and emotional energy. It is useful in a type of yogic rituals and meditative discovery of radiant inner energy (prana flows) and mind-body connections. The meditation is aided by extensive symbology, mantras, diagrams, models (deity and mandala). The practitioner proceeds step by step from perceptible models, to increasingly abstract models where deity and external mandala are abandoned, inner self and internal mandalas are awakened.

These ideas are not unique to Hindu and Buddhist traditions. Similar and overlapping concepts emerged in other cultures in the East and the West, and these are variously called by other names such as subtle body, spirit body, esoteric anatomy, sidereal body and etheric body. According to Geoffrey Samuel and Jay Johnston, professors of Religious studies known for their studies on Yoga and esoteric traditions:

Contrast with classical yoga

Chakra and related beliefs have been important to the esoteric traditions, but they are not directly related to mainstream yoga. According to the Indologist Edwin Bryant and other scholars, the goals of classical yoga such as spiritual liberation (freedom, self-knowledge, moksha) is "attained entirely differently in classical yoga, and the cakra / nadi / kundalini physiology is completely peripheral to it."

Number of chakras
There is no consensus in Hinduism about the number of chakras because the concept of chakras has been evolved and interpreted differently by various sects, schools of thought, and spiritual traditions within Hinduism over the centuries. While some traditions follow the seven main chakra system as described in Patanjali's Yoga Sutra, others recognize additional chakras or a different number of chakras. The lack of a universally accepted standard has led to variation and diversity in the interpretation and understanding of chakras within Hinduism. There are several sects within Hinduism that have their own unique interpretations and understandings of the concept of chakras. Here are some of the major sects that have different perspectives on chakras:

Bhakti Yoga: In Bhakti Yoga, the number of chakras varies, but the focus is often on the heart chakra as the center of spiritual devotion.
Ayurveda (3): In Ayurveda, there are three main chakras, known as the "Marmas," which are considered to be the focal points of the physical, mental, and spiritual energies in the body.
Shaivism (5): In Shaivism, there are five chakras, with the focus being on the heart and crown chakras.
Tantra (6): In Tantra, there are traditionally said to be four to six chakras, with the crown chakra being considered the highest.
Kashmir Shaivism (6-7): In Kashmir Shaivism, there are six or seven chakras, with the focus being on the awakening of the divine energy within.
Hatha Yoga (7): In Hatha Yoga, there are seven main chakras, but some Hatha Yoga traditions also recognize additional chakras.
Kundalini Yoga (7): In Kundalini Yoga, there are seven main chakras, but additional minor chakras are also recognized.
Nath Tradition (8): In the Nath tradition, there are eight main chakras, with the emphasis being on the awakening of the divine energy through these centers.
Vaishnavism (12): In Vaishnavism, there are twelve chakras, with the emphasis being on the spiritual ascent through these centers.

Classical traditions

The classical eastern traditions, particularly those that developed in India during the 1st millennium AD, primarily describe nadi and chakra in a "subtle body" context. To them, they are in same dimension as of the psyche-mind reality that is invisible yet real. In the nadi and cakra flow the prana (breath, life energy). The concept of "life energy" varies between the texts, ranging from simple inhalation-exhalation to far more complex association with breath-mind-emotions-sexual energy. This prana or essence is what vanishes when a person dies, leaving a gross body. Some of this concept states this subtle body is what withdraws within, when one sleeps. All of it is believed to be reachable, awake-able and important for an individual's body-mind health, and how one relates to other people in one's life. This subtle body network of nadi and chakra is, according to some later Indian theories and many new age speculations, closely associated with emotions.

Hindu Tantra

Esoteric traditions in Hinduism mention numerous numbers and arrangements of chakras, of which a classical system of six-plus-one, the last being the Sahasrara, is most prevalent. This seven-part system, central to the core texts of hatha yoga, is one among many systems found in Hindu tantric literature. Hindu Tantra associates six Yoginis with six places in the subtle body, corresponding to the six chakras of the six-plus-one system.

The Chakra methodology is extensively developed in the goddess tradition of Hinduism called Shaktism. It is an important concept along with yantras, mandalas and kundalini yoga in its practice. Chakra in Shakta tantrism means circle, an "energy center" within, as well as being a term for group rituals such as in chakra-puja (worship within a circle) which may or may not involve tantra practice. The cakra-based system is a part of the meditative exercises that came to be known as yoga.

Buddhist Tantra

The esoteric traditions in Buddhism generally teach four chakras. In some early Buddhist sources, these chakras are identified as: manipura (navel), anahata (heart), vishuddha (throat) and ushnisha kamala (crown). In one development within the Nyingma lineage of the Mantrayana of Tibetan Buddhism a popular conceptualization of chakras in increasing subtlety and increasing order is as follows: Nirmanakaya (gross self), Sambhogakaya (subtle self), Dharmakaya (causal self), and Mahasukhakaya (non-dual self), each vaguely and indirectly corresponding to the categories within the Shaiva Mantramarga universe, i.e., Svadhisthana, Anahata, Visuddha, Sahasrara, etc. However, depending on the meditational tradition, these vary between three and six. The chakras are considered psycho-spiritual constituents, each bearing meaningful correspondences to cosmic processes and their postulated Buddha counterpart.

A system of five chakras is common among the Mother class of Tantras and these five chakras along with their correspondences are:

 Basal chakra (Element: Earth, Buddha: Amoghasiddhi, Bija mantra: LAM)
 Abdominal chakra (Element: Water, Buddha: Ratnasambhava, Bija mantra: VAM)
 Heart chakra (Element: Fire, Buddha: Akshobhya, Bija mantra: RAM)
 Throat chakra (Element: Wind, Buddha: Amitabha, Bija mantra: YAM)
 Crown chakra (Element: Space, Buddha: Vairochana, Bija mantra: KHAM)

Chakras clearly play a key role in Tibetan Buddhism, and are considered to be the pivotal providence of Tantric thinking. And, the precise use of the chakras across the gamut of tantric sadhanas gives little space to doubt the primary efficacy of Tibetan Buddhism as distinct religious agency, that being that precise revelation that, without Tantra there would be no Chakras, but more importantly, without Chakras, there is no Tibetan Buddhism. The highest practices in Tibetan Buddhism point to the ability to bring the subtle pranas of an entity into alignment with the central channel, and to thus penetrate the realisation of the ultimate unity, namely, the "organic harmony" of one's individual consciousness of Wisdom with the co-attainment of All-embracing Love, thus synthesizing a direct cognition of absolute Buddhahood.

According to Samuel, the buddhist esoteric systems developed cakra and nadi as "central to their soteriological process". The theories were sometimes, but not always, coupled with a unique system of physical exercises, called yantra yoga or phrul khor.

Chakras, according to the Bon tradition, enable the gestalt of experience, with each of the five major chakras, being psychologically linked with the five experiential qualities of unenlightened consciousness, the six realms of woe.

The tsa lung practice embodied in the Trul khor lineage, unbaffles the primary channels, thus activating and circulating liberating prana. Yoga awakens the deep mind, thus bringing forth positive attributes, inherent gestalts, and virtuous qualities. In a computer analogy, the screen of one's consciousness is slated and an attribute-bearing file is called up that contains necessary positive or negative, supportive qualities.

Tantric practice is said to eventually transform all experience into clear light. The practice aims to liberate from all negative conditioning, and the deep cognitive salvation of freedom from control and unity of perception and cognition.

The seven chakra system

The more common and most studied chakra system incorporates six major chakras along with a seventh center generally not regarded as a chakra. These points are arranged vertically along the axial channel (sushumna nadi in Hindu texts, Avadhuti in some Buddhist texts). According to Gavin Flood, this system of six chakras plus the sahasrara "center" at the crown first appears in the Kubjikāmata-tantra, an 11th-century Kaula work.

It was this chakra system that was translated in the early 20th century by Sir John Woodroffe (also called Arthur Avalon) in the text The Serpent Power. Avalon translated the Hindu text Ṣaṭ-Cakra-Nirūpaṇa meaning the examination (nirūpaṇa) of the seven  (ṣaṭ) chakras (cakra).

The Chakras are traditionally considered meditation aids. The yogi progresses from lower chakras to the highest chakra blossoming in the crown of the head, internalizing the journey of spiritual ascent. In both the Hindu kundalini and Buddhist candali traditions, the chakras are pierced by a dormant energy residing near or in the lowest chakra. In Hindu texts she is known as Kundalini, while in Buddhist texts she is called Candali or Tummo (Tibetan: gtum mo, "fierce one").

Below are the common new age description of these six chakras and the seventh point known as sahasrara. This new age version incorporates the Newtonian colors of the rainbow not found in any ancient Indian system.

Western chakra system

History 

Kurt Leland, for the Theosophical Society in America, concluded that the western chakra system was produced by an "unintentional collaboration" of many groups of people: esotericists and clairvoyants, often theosophical; Indologists; the scholar of myth, Joseph Campbell; the founders of the Esalen Institute and the psychological tradition of Carl Jung; the colour system of Charles W. Leadbeater's 1927 book The Chakras, treated as traditional lore by some modern Indian yogis; and energy healers such as Barbara Brennan. Leland states that far from being traditional, the two main elements of the modern system, the rainbow colours and the list of qualities, first appeared together only in 1977.

The concept of a set of seven chakras came to the West in the 1880s; at that time each chakra was associated with a nerve plexus. In 1918, Sir John Woodroffe, alias Arthur Avalon, translated two Indian texts, the Ṣaṭ-Cakra-Nirūpaṇa and the Pādukā-Pañcaka, and in his book The Serpent Power drew Western attention to the  seven chakra theory.

In the 1920s, each of the seven chakras was associated with an endocrine gland, a tradition that has persisted. More recently, the lower six chakras have been linked to both nerve plexuses and glands. The seven rainbow colours were added by Leadbeater in 1927; a variant system in the 1930s proposed six colours plus white. Leadbeater's theory was influenced by Johann Georg Gichtel's 1696 book Theosophia Practica, which mentioned inner "force centres".

Psychological and other attributes such as layers of the aura, developmental stages, associated diseases, Aristotelian elements, emotions, and states of consciousness were added still later. A wide range of supposed correspondences such as with alchemical metals, astrological signs and planets, foods, herbs, gemstones, homeopathic remedies, Kabbalistic spheres, musical notes, totem animals, and Tarot cards have also been proposed.

New Age

In Anatomy of the Spirit (1996), Caroline Myss described the function of chakras as follows: "Every thought and experience you've ever had in your life gets filtered through these chakra databases. Each event is recorded into your cells...". The chakras are described as being aligned in an ascending column from the base of the spine to the top of the head. New Age practices often associate each chakra with a certain colour. In various traditions, chakras are associated with multiple physiological functions, an aspect of consciousness, a classical element, and other distinguishing characteristics; these do not correspond to those used in ancient Indian systems. The chakras are visualised as lotuses or flowers with a different number of petals in every chakra.

The chakras are thought to vitalise the physical body and to be associated with interactions of a physical, emotional and mental nature. They are considered loci of life energy or prana (which New Age belief equates with shakti, qi in Chinese, ki in Japanese, koach-ha-guf in Hebrew, bios in Greek, and aether in both Greek and English), which is thought to flow among them along pathways called nadi. The function of the chakras is to spin and draw in this energy to keep the spiritual, mental, emotional and physical health of the body in balance.

Rudolf Steiner considered the chakra system to be dynamic and evolving. He suggested that this system has become different for modern people than it was in ancient times and that it will, in turn, be radically different in future times. Steiner described a sequence of development that begins with the upper chakras and moves down, rather than moving in the opposite direction. He gave suggestions on how to develop the chakras through disciplining thoughts, feelings, and will. According to Florin Lowndes, a "spiritual student" can further develop and deepen or elevate thinking consciousness when taking the step from the "ancient path" of schooling to the "new path" represented by Steiner's The Philosophy of Freedom.

Skeptical response 

The not-for-profit Edinburgh Skeptics Society states that despite their popularity, "there has never been any evidence for these meridian lines or chakras". It adds that while practitioners sometimes cite "scientific evidence" for their claims, such evidence is often "incredibly shaky".

See also

 Aura
 Dantian—energy centre in Chinese Taoist systems
 Surya Namaskar—the Sun Salutation, in which each posture is sometimes associated with a chakra and a mantra

Notes

References

Further reading 

 
 
  (Two volumes)
 
 

 
 
 
 
 
 
 Banerji, S. C. Tantra in Bengal. Second Revised and Enlarged Edition. (Manohar: Delhi, 1992) 
 
 Goswami, Shyam Sundar. Layayoga: The Definitive Guide to the Chakras and Kundalini, Routledge & Kegan Paul, 1980.
 
 Khalsa, Guru Dharam Singh; O'Keeffe, Darryl. The Kundalini Yoga Experience Simon & Schuster, 2002.
 Judith, Anodea (1996). Eastern Body Western Mind: Psychology and the Chakra System As A Path to the Self. Berkeley, California, USA: Celestial Arts Publishing. 
 Lowndes, Florin. 'Enlivening the Chakra of the Heart: The Fundamental Spiritual Exercises of Rudolf Steiner' , first English edition 1998 from the original German edition of 1996, comparing 'traditional' chakra teaching, and that of C.W. Leadbeater, with that of Rudolf Steiner.

 
Consciousness–matter dualism
Hindu philosophical concepts
Meditation
New Age
Spiritual practice
Theosophical philosophical concepts
Vitalism
Eastern esotericism